Abdulai Abanga (born 25 May 1970) is a Ghanaian politician who is a member of the New Patriotic Party. He is the member of parliament for the Binduri constituency in the Upper East Region.

Early life and education 
Abdulai was born in Akwatia a town in the Eastern region of Ghana on 25 May 1970 but he hails from Binduri/Bawku in the Upper East Region of Ghana. He attended Akwatia L/A Primary School and later continued at Bansi Primary School in Binduri and had his High school  education at the Ghana Secondary School (Ghanasco), in Tamale.

References 

1970 births
Living people
Ghanaian Muslims
New Patriotic Party politicians
Ghanaian MPs 2021–2025
People from Eastern Region (Ghana)